Elvis Now is the sixteenth studio album by American singer Elvis Presley, released on February 20, 1972. The only single from the album, "Until It's Time for You to Go" / "We Can Make the Morning" reached number 9 on the Easy Listening chart in the US in March 1972 and number 5 on the UK Singles Chart in April 1972. The album was certified Gold on March 27, 1992, by the RIAA. "Sylvia" became a hit for Presley in Brazil in the 1970s.

Content
Despite the "now" in the title, the tracks on this album were recorded anywhere from one to three years before its release. The Beatles' "Hey Jude" was a leftover from the sessions at the American Studio in Memphis in early 1969. "Sylvia" and "I Was Born About Ten Thousand Years Ago" were recorded during the Nashville sessions of June 1970 (the latter had been released in fragmentary form on the Elvis Country album). The rest of the songs were from more recent sessions held at RCA Studio B in Nashville in March, May, and June 1971.

Unlike Presley's other albums of that period (Elvis Country, He Touched Me and Elvis sings The Wonderful World of Christmas, each dedicated to a particular genre) Elvis Now encompasses a variety of genres, including country, gospel, soul and pop.

Reissues
In 2010, an extended version of the album was released as part of the FTD collector series. It consists of the original 1972 album and a number of bonus tracks, originating from the 1971 Nashville sessions: two non-album singles from 1971 ("I'm Leavin'" and "It's Only Love"), a B-side from the upcoming "An American Trilogy" single ("The First Time Ever I Saw Your Face") as well as plenty of outtakes, including "Don't Think Twice, It's All Right" informal jam, lasting more than nine minutes (its shortened version having been included on the 1973 Elvis album).

Track listing

Original release

2010 reissue (FTD)

Personnel
Sourced from Keith Flynn.

 Elvis Presley - lead vocals; acoustic rhythm guitar on "Hey Jude" (uncertain), “Sylvia” (uncertain) and “I Was Born About Ten Thousand Years Ago”
 James Burton - lead guitar
 Norbert Putnam - bass
 Chip Young - rhythm guitar
 Charlie Hodge - acoustic rhythm guitar
 David Briggs - piano
 Jerry Carrigan - drums, percussion on "Fools Rush In (Where Angels Fear to Tread", "We Can Make the Morning" and "Help Me Make It Through the Night"
 Charlie McCoy - harmonica on "I Was Born About Ten Thousand Years Ago" and "Early Morning Rain"; organ, percussion, or harmonica on "Sylvia" and "Miracle of the Rosary"; organ on "Help Me Make It Through the Night", "Put Your Hand in the Hand" and "Until It's Time For You To Go"
 Kenneth Buttrey - drums on "Until It's Time For You To Go", "Fools Rush In (Where Angels Fear to Tread)", "We Can Make the Morning" and "Help Me Make It Through the Night"
 Reggie Young - lead guitar on "Hey Jude"
 Bobby Wood - piano on "Hey Jude"
 Bobby Emmons - organ on "Hey Jude"
 Tommy Cogbill - bass on "Hey Jude"
 Mike Leech - bass on "Hey Jude"
 Gene Chrisman - drums on "Hey Jude"
 Joe Moscheo - piano on "Fools Rush In (Where Angels Fear to Tread)"
 Glen Spreen - organ on "Until It's Time For You to Go"

References

External links

Elvis Presley albums
1972 albums
Albums produced by Felton Jarvis
RCA Records albums